The men's tournament was held from 28 July to 6 August 2017.

Evandro Oliveira and André Stein won the title, defeating hosts Clemens Doppler and Alexander Horst in the final, 23–21, 22–20. Stein became the youngest player to win a gold medal at the World Championships at the age of 22.

Preliminary round

Pool A

|}

|}

Pool B

|}

|}

Pool C

|}

|}

Pool D

|}

|}

Pool E

|}

|}

Pool F

|}

|}

Pool G

|}

|}

Pool H

|}

|}

Pool I

|}

|}

Pool J

|}

|}

Pool K

|}

|}

Pool L

|}

|}

3rd place ranked teams
The four best third-placed teams will advance directly to the round of 32. The other eight third-placed teams will play in the Lucky Losers Playoffs for the additional four spots in the Round of 32.

|}

Lucky losers playoffs

|}

Knockout stage

Round of 32

|}

Round of 16

|}

Quarterfinals

|}

Semifinals

|}

Third place match

|}

Final

|}

References

External links
Official website

Men
2017 in men's volleyball